Students Helping Honduras (SHH) is an international NGO operating in both the United States and Honduras.  While the majority of its projects are centered on the peripheries of El Progreso, the organization engages in projects throughout all of Honduras.

History

Origin 
Shin Fujiyama and his sister Cosmo Fujiyama first traveled to Honduras in the summer of 2004, volunteering on a mission trip organized by the Campus Christian Community of the University of Mary Washington to help victims of poverty and domestic abuse.  Shin met and grew close to the people of a squatter village called Siete de Abril (Spanish for April 7th); the villagers, whose homes had been destroyed by Hurricane Mitch in 1998, named the village after the date on which their sudden homelessness forced them to establish it. Having borne witness to the harsh conditions in which the villagers and their children lived, Shin vowed to help them overcome poverty.  The semester following his trip, Shin founded Students Helping Honduras (SHH) as an official student organization within his university, as did his sister, who attended the College of William & Mary.

Their first walkathon, held in the spring of 2006, raised over $148,000 with the help of a matching grant from Doris Buffett, founder of The Sunshine Lady Foundation.  Those proceeds allowed the students to travel back to Honduras and build a school with the villagers of Siete de Abril.

Doris Buffett offered the students a second matching grant of $100,000, on the condition that the students raise that very amount by the end of the semester.  The students reached out to friends from other college campuses including Virginia Tech and the University of Virginia, both of which would establish chapters of SHH. The band of students raised $110,000 by the end of the semester, earning Buffett's matching grant for a combined total of over $210,000.  With this money, SHH was able to purchase a land title on which the villagers could live legally, and they had raised enough money to build one cinder block house for each family from Siete de Abril.

Shin registered Students Helping Honduras as a 501(c)(3) nonprofit organization in 2007, as advised by Dr. Gregory Stanton, founder of Genocide Watch.  Today the organization hosts service trips throughout the year as part of its formal operations.  Students and adults travel to Honduras in groups to assist with construction, build relationships with the local residents and witness the conditions in which they live.

Evolution 
Students Helping Honduras has restructured its governing body in at least two ways since its inception: it has rewritten its mission statement and instituted a Student Board to represent the interests of student volunteers.

Our projects

Villa Soleada 

This project consists of forty-four 22'x 28' homes, each with three bedrooms, a central room, bathroom, and shower. The design of the homes and the entire village was based on drawings made by the community members. The village also includes a community center usable for church gatherings or town meetings, land for farming and sustainable businesses, a well, a library, an eco-friendly waste management system, electricity, and most importantly, a soccer field.

Villa Soleada Bilingual School 
After conducting a household survey of the families living in Siete de Abril, it was found that 0% of residents had graduated from high school. The Villa Soleada Bilingual School (VSBS) was built with the goal of changing the graduation rate of Siete de Abril, now Villa Soleada, to 100% in one generation. Each year, one new grade level is added to the school, with the VSBS High School being inaugurated in March, 2020.

Currently, the school has roughly 300 students from Villa Soleada and the surrounding areas. The students from Villa Soleada attend the school on a full scholarship, with students from wealthier neighborhoods paying $40 a month (in U.S. dollars); this is a very affordable bilingual education compared to other bilingual schools nearby. The teaching staff is made up of both Honduran and American teachers.

The Villa Soleada Bilingual School provides a longer school day than the typical Honduran school. They also offer summer enrichment classes, hoping to bridge the summer gap in learning.

Villa Soleada Children's Home 
Students Helping Honduras believes that there is no one-size-fits-all solution. They offer multiple services: temporary/permanent living at the Villa Soleada Children’s Home, family reunification, and kinship care. The project consists of multiple homes, each with Honduran houseparents that look after 10-15 children.

The children living in the Children’s Home receive nutritious meals, comprehensive healthcare, schooling, afternoon tutoring sessions, mentoring, farm training, life skills training, therapy services, counseling, gym access, art workshops, and soccer training. Many attend the Villa Soleada Bilingual School, with some attending schools in El Progreso depending on their needs.

After a child ages out of the Children’s Home, they are able to live in the adjacent transitional home. Here they are able to learn skills such as personal finance, cooking, traveling, effective communication, and finding internships and jobs. SHH provides the support they need to continue their education until they are ready to live on their own.

School Builds 
Students Helping Honduras is on a mission to build 1,000 schools across Honduras. School builds follow a three-way partnership model: SHH provides the construction supplies and professional labor, the families in the communities provide sweat equity (unskilled labor), and the local government provides heavy machinery, sand to mix cement, and the teachers. All supplies are locally sourced and all projects are supported by the local government and businesses.

Train for Change 
Train for Change is a program run by Students Helping Honduras that empowers local Honduran teacher leaders through professional development to improve the quality of education for 1 million children in the most impoverished areas in the country.

Impact Report 2019 
School enrollment increased by 39.1% on average after the completion of a project
The average number of classes cancelled due to rain or inadequate protection from weather dropped from 14 days per year to less than one day a year
The average number of teachers per school increased from 6.5 to 8.5
99% of students reported they like the new classrooms
99% of parents were satisfied with the project
100% of directors were satisfied with the project
98% of teachers were satisfied with the project
97% of participants agreed that they were prouder of their school after the completion of the project
94% of participants agreed that they believe more in women’s capacity to contribute to projects
98% of teachers and directors agreed that the project helped them perform their jobs better

Membership and chapters 

The membership of SHH consists of more than seven thousand students, young professionals, and adults from different states. Chapters are typically located on college campuses (U.S.) and at high schools.

Chapters typically host fundraisers on their school’s campus to raise money for the school build projects. SHH also hosts annual Fall Retreats and Summits in the U.S. for chapter members to come together and learn more about the organization. Each year in Honduras, SHH hosts a Leadership Week for chapter leaders to learn, connect, and prepare for the next year.

Each year, SHH hires 1-3 Student Directors to serve as the liaison between the Honduran staff and chapter members in the United States.

U.S. college campus chapters include:

American University
College of William & Mary
Christopher Newport University
Clemson University
Hollins University
Hofstra University
George Washington University
George Mason University
Georgia Southern University
Georgetown University
James Madison University
Wake Forest University
Marymount University
University of Kentucky
Old Dominion University
Penn State
Queens College, City University of New York
Stony Brook University
Radford University
Shenandoah University
UNC-Chapel Hill
University of Mary Washington
University of Maryland
University of Michigan
University of Virginia
University of Rochester
University of South Carolina
Virginia Commonwealth University
Virginia Tech
Washington College
Towson University
Salisbury University
University of Tennessee
University of Maryland Baltimore County
University of Dayton
Cornell University
Moravian College

High school chapters include:

Haddonfield Memorial High School
Mountain View High School
Freehold Township High School
Wakeland High School
Lawrence High School
Manalapan High School
Colonial Forge High School

References 

Children's charities based in the United States
Development charities based in the United States
Charities based in Virginia
Non-profit organizations based in Fredericksburg, Virginia
Foreign charities operating in Honduras